Niphona hepaticolor is a species of beetle in the family Cerambycidae. It was described by Heller in 1923. It is known from Moluccas, Java, the Philippines and Borneo.

References

hepaticolor
Beetles described in 1923